The Royal Adelaide was an iron sailing ship of 1400 tons built by William Patterson at Bristol in 1865.

She was wrecked on Chesil Beach on 25 November 1872, while on a passage from London to Sydney with 32 crew members and 35 passengers. In bad weather, the ship tried to reach the shelter of Portland Harbour, but was forced into Lyme Bay from which there was no exit in a storm. The anchors were lowered to try to prevent the ship being blown onto Chesil Beach. However, the anchors dragged and the ship began to break up on the beach. All but seven on board were saved.

A large crowd gathered on the shore to help with the rescue and the salvage of the cargo, part of which was gin and brandy. By the end of the night four of the wreckers had died from exposure, having spent the night on the beach after becoming drunk on the cargo.

She now lies at  OSGB36 and is accessible  to scuba divers from the shore.

References

External links
Weymouth Shipwrecks

1865 ships
Sailing ships of the United Kingdom
Ocean liners
Passenger ships of the United Kingdom
Maritime incidents in November 1872
Shipwrecks in the English Channel
Disasters in Dorset
Wreck diving sites in the United Kingdom
Ships built in Bristol
19th century in Dorset